Corruption in Jordan is a social and economic issue.

Dynamics 
Societal interests in Jordan are generally not channelled through political parties, but through informal networks. Favouritism, cronyism, nepotism and bribery, as is the use of influence or personal and business connections to gain favours, such as jobs or access to goods and services, are covered by a particular phenomenon known as wasta, the middleman. Transparency International's 2017 Corruption Perception Index ranks the country 59th least corrupt out of 180 countries.

There have been corruption cases involved high-level business and political officials with connections to the royal family. A business survey, the World Economic Forum's Global Competitiveness Report 2013-2014, reports that corruption is considered one of the obstacles for doing business in Jordan by business executives.

See also 
 International Anti-Corruption Academy
 Group of States Against Corruption
 International Anti-Corruption Day
 ISO 37001 Anti-bribery management systems
 United Nations Convention against Corruption
 OECD Anti-Bribery Convention
 Transparency International

References

External links
Jordan Corruption Profile from the Business Anti-Corruption Portal

Jordan
Jordan
Crime in Jordan by type
Politics of Jordan
Society of Jordan